The Serran or Serrano-Gabrielino languages are a branch of the Uto-Aztecan language family that comprises the Serrano language, extinct Kitanemuk language (Serran proper), and Tongva, all indigenous to southern California. The branch has been considered to be part of the Takic subgroup, but there is doubt about the validity of Takic as a genetic unit, the similarities between the languages classed as Takic possibly being due primarily to borrowing.

References

Northern Uto-Aztecan languages
Indigenous languages of California